Michael Pollock (1916–2006) was a British Admiral of the Fleet and First Sea Lord.

Michael or Mike Pollock may also refer to:

 Michael Pollock (tenor) (1921–2003), American operatic tenor, opera director, and voice teacher
 Mike Pollock (rugby league), rugby league footballer who played in the 1910s and 1920s for New Zealand, and Wellington
 Eileen "Mike" Pollock, American television screenwriter and producer
 Mike Pollock (voice actor)  (born 1965), American voice actor
 Michael Pollock (politician), member of the Kentucky House of Representatives from the 51st district

See also
 Michael Pollack (born 1939), better known as Michael J. Pollard, American actor
 Michael Pollack (musician) (born 1994), American songwriter, singer, and record producer
 Mike Pollak (born 1985), American footballer for the Indianapolis Colts, and Carolina Panthers
 Mike Polich (born 1952), American ice hockey player
 Michael Pollok, American attorney who is involved with the 99 Percent Declaration movement